Antioch is an unincorporated community in Prince William County, Virginia. Antioch lies at the intersection of Antioch, Mountain, and Waterfall Roads near the Fauquier County line.

Unincorporated communities in Prince William County, Virginia
Washington metropolitan area
Unincorporated communities in Virginia